Svetlana Zalevskaya (born 14 June 1974 in Almaty) is a retired female high jumper from Kazakhstan. Her personal best jump is 1.98 metres indoors on 2 March 1996 Samara. Her outdoor best is 1.97 metres, achieved in June 1996 in Pierre-Bénite.

Achievements

See also
List of Maccabiah records in athletics

References

External links
 
sports-reference

1974 births
Living people
Sportspeople from Almaty
Soviet female high jumpers
Kazakhstani female high jumpers
Athletes (track and field) at the 1996 Summer Olympics
Athletes (track and field) at the 2000 Summer Olympics
Olympic athletes of Kazakhstan
Athletes (track and field) at the 1994 Asian Games
Asian Games medalists in athletics (track and field)
Universiade medalists in athletics (track and field)
Asian Games silver medalists for Kazakhstan
World Athletics Championships athletes for Kazakhstan
Medalists at the 1994 Asian Games
Universiade silver medalists for Kazakhstan
Medalists at the 1995 Summer Universiade
Jewish female athletes (track and field)
Maccabiah Games gold medalists
Kazakhstani people of Russian descent